The So Sri Lanka Pro 2019 was a surfing competition which was held as a part of the World Surfing League Qualifying Series 3000. This was the second edition of the Sri Lanka Pro League and it was also the first such event to be conducted since 2011 after 8 years. It was held from 25 September to 29 September in Arugam Bay coinciding the World Tourism Day on 27 September. The event featured 124 competitors from 24 nations including the retired former world champion Mark Occhilupo. The event was titled as So Sri Lanka which is also used as a slogan to promote tourism industry in Sri Lanka by the Sri Lanka Tourism Promotion Bureau from 2018. Sri Lankan Airlines is the official airline partner for the series.

So Sri Lanka Pro 2019 was hosted as a means of developing and promoting the tourism sector in Sri Lanka which was notably affected following the 2019 Easter attacks. The ground arrangements were prepared by Lanka Sportreizen and the event was officially launched on 4 September 2019.
It was organized by Sri Lanka Tourism Promotion Bureau, Sri Lanka Surfing Federation in affiliation with World Surf League. Australia's Julian Wilson is the defending champion who won the tournament in 2011.

Australia's Mitch Parkinson won the tournament defeating Oney Anwar of Indonesia by scoring a whopping 19.17 with a lead of six points against his opponent in the final. The final was also the first matchup between these two in a WSL event and also marked Parkinson's first WSL career title victory.

Competition
The competition featured 124 competitors from 24 nations. The tournament consists of five rounds followed by knockout stages. Round 1 consisting of eight heat events began and concluded on 25 September 2019, the first day of the five day competition. The round consisting of 16 heat events 2 began and concluded on 26 September 2019. Round 3 consisting of 16 heat events of the competition began on 27 September 2019 and concluded on 28 September. Round 4 and Round 5 each comprising 8 heat events began on 28 September and concluded on the same day. Quarterfinals, Semifinals and Final were all held on the final day of the event on 29 September 2019.

Seeding Round

Round 1

Round 2

results

Round 3

Round 4

Round 5

Quarterfinals

Semifinals

Final

References

External links
 World Surf League
 So Sri Lanka Pro 2019

2019 World Surf League
2019 in Sri Lankan sport
Surfing in Sri Lanka
September 2019 sports events in Asia